Elliot Griffin Thomas (15 July 1926 – 28 February 2019) was an African-American Catholic prelate who served as the Bishop of the Diocese of Saint Thomas.

Life
Thomas was born in Pittsburgh, Pennsylvania, on July 15, 1926. His family had lived in Tortola, British Virgin Islands, and returned there in 1934. Thomas was enrolled in the Methodist Day School in Road Town and as a teenager attended Charlotte Amalie High School, St. Thomas, where he graduated in 1945.

Following his graduation, Thomas served as a Clerk of the Municipal Homestead Commission and Clerk of the Adult Evening School in St. Thomas. In 1945, he enrolled in the College of Pharmacy at Howard University in Washington, D.C., where he earned a Bachelor of Science degree in 1950. After qualifying as a registered pharmacist in Detroit, Michigan, he joined the United States Army and was assigned to FranMort-Hoechst and to Munich. After returning to the Virgin Islands, he became a pharmacist in St. Thomas. From 1954 to 1959, Thomas worked as a pharmacist with the Veterans Administration in Erie, Pennsylvania, where he also studied part-time at Gannon College, majoring in Business Administration.

On October 2, 1957, Thomas converted to Catholicism and was received into the Catholic Church at St. Peter's Cathedral in Erie, Pennsylvania. He began his studies for the priesthood in 1982 at St. Vincent de Paul Regional Seminary in Boynton Beach, Florida. He was ordained to the priesthood for the Diocese of St. Thomas in the Virgin Islands on June 6, 1986, and was appointed Episcopal Vicar for the diocese and Pastor of Holy Family Church.

Thomas served as pastor of St. Ann's Church on St. Croix, pastor of Holy Family Church, Dean of the Diocese and the Vicar General. The Diocesan Consulters of the Diocese of St. Thomas unanimously elected Thomas to serve as Diocesan Administrator, a post he filled from August 11, 1992, until he was named as the Third Bishop of the Virgin Islands on October 30, 1993. He was consecrated and installed at the Cathedral of Saints Peter and Paul in Saint Thomas on December 12, 1993. Thomas resigned in June 1999.

See also
 

 Catholic Church hierarchy
 Catholic Church in the United States
 Historical list of the Catholic bishops of the United States
 List of Catholic bishops of the United States
 Lists of patriarchs, archbishops, and bishops

References

External links
Roman Catholic Diocese of St. Thomas Official Site
 National Black Catholic Congress profile of Elliot Griffin Thomas
 Catholic Hierarchy website profile of Elliot Griffin Thomas

Episcopal succession

1926 births
2019 deaths
Military personnel from Pittsburgh
Religious leaders from Pittsburgh
Howard University alumni
Gannon University alumni
American pharmacists
Converts to Roman Catholicism from Protestantism
20th-century Roman Catholic bishops in the United States
African-American Roman Catholic bishops
Roman Catholic bishops of Saint Thomas
20th-century African-American people
21st-century African-American people
American Roman Catholic bishops by contiguous area of the United States